Carlos Sambuceti (6 August 1922 – 23 May 2003) was an Argentine rower. He competed in the men's coxless pair event at the 1948 Summer Olympics.

References

External links
 

1922 births
2003 deaths
Argentine male rowers
Olympic rowers of Argentina
Rowers at the 1948 Summer Olympics
Place of birth missing